
Little Finland (also known as Hobgoblin’s Playground and Devil’s Fire) is a scenic red rock area, located in a remote section of  Clark County, Nevada, south of Mesquite, known for its red rock scenery and strangely-shaped, delicate rock formations. The rock formations are composed of red Aztec Sandstone, fossil sand dunes. Many of the features are small erosional fins, hence the name.

Little Finland is accessible via the BLM Gold Butte Backcountry Byway, which also goes through the historic mining town of Gold Butte, Nevada, established in 1908. Other nearby attractions include Whitney Pockets, another scenic red rock area with petroglyphs, and the Devils Throat, a sinkhole. The Gold Butte region is public land managed by the Bureau of Land Management that contains seven BLM-designated Areas of Critical Environmental Concern (ACEC). Since December 2016, Little Finland and the surrounding area have additional federal protection within Gold Butte National Monument.

Two BLM wilderness areas are nearby. The Lime Canyon Wilderness  borders Little Finland and the west side of the Gold Butte Byway loop. The Jumbo Springs Wilderness  is south of the Gold Butte townsite.

Gallery

See also

Lake Mead National Recreation Area,  to the west and south of Little Finland 
Grand Canyon-Parashant National Monument, to the east, in Arizona 
Bureau of Land Management Back Country Byway

References

External links

Gold Butte Back Country Byway, map and guide
Gold Butte ghost town.
Native American Cultural Gem at Risk. Gold Butte. Wilderness.org

Rock formations of Nevada
Gold Butte National Monument
Bureau of Land Management areas in Nevada
Landforms of Clark County, Nevada